Henley Rowing Club is a rowing club on the River Thames based on Wargrave Road, Henley-on-Thames, Oxfordshire.

History
The club was founded in 1839. The club were the Victor Ludorum champions at the 2014 British Rowing Junior Championships, 2016 British Rowing Junior Championships, 2017 British Rowing Junior Championships and 2018 British Rowing Junior Championships.

Honours

British champions

Key- +coxed, -coxless, x sculls, c composite, L lightweight

Henley Royal Regatta

See also
Rowing on the River Thames

References

Sport in Oxfordshire
Henley-on-Thames
Rowing clubs of the River Thames
Buildings and structures on the River Thames
Rowing clubs in England
Rowing clubs in Oxfordshire
Remenham